Chamaemyia elegans is a species of fly in the family Chamaemyiidae. It is widely distributed in Europe.

References

External links 
 

Chamaemyiidae
Muscomorph flies of Europe
Insects described in 1809
Taxa named by Georg Wolfgang Franz Panzer